Argiope florida, known generally as the Florida argiope or Florida garden spider, is a species of orb weaver in the spider family Araneidae. It is found in the United States.
In fact, the habitat of Argiope florida is restricted to some areas in southeast United States.

References

External links

 

florida
Articles created by Qbugbot
Spiders described in 1944